Howard David Higgins (August 23, 1903 — April 6, 1980) was a bishop of the Reformed Episcopal Church in the mid-twentieth century. He also served as Professor of Church History at the Theological Seminary of the Reformed Episcopal Church in Philadelphia from 1930 until his retirement in 1972, and editor of the Episcopal Recorder from 1937 until his death. Higgins was well respected for his faithfulness to the Bible and his friendly demeanor and collaborative leadership style.

Biography 
Higgins was born in New York City in 1903 to Peter David Higgins and his wife Emma Howard Higgins. He was a boyhood friend of Robert Knight Rudolph, and beginning at the age of sixteen he often visited the Rudolphs in their summer home in Dorset, VT, where Higgins enjoyed listening to Rudolph’s father, Bishop Robert Livingston Rudolph talk about the founding and early history of the Reformed Episcopal Church. The Higgins family at the time were members of First Reformed Episcopal Church in New York, pastored by Dr. William T. Sabine, who later became a bishop himself. Higgins married Ethel Scott in 1944.

Education
Higgins graduated from the Theological Seminary of the Reformed Episcopal Church with a diploma in 1924. When he received his undergraduate degree from Columbia University three years later, he exchanged his seminary diploma for a Bachelor of Divinity. He then continued his education at Princeton Theological Seminary, where he received a Master of Theology degree in 1928. In 1938, he was awarded a master's degree from Columbia. Reformed Episcopal Seminary awarded him an honorary Doctor of Divinity the following year.

Ordination
Higgins was ordained deacon on November 28, 1924, by Bishop Rudolph and presbyter on October 30, 1925, by Bishop Robert Westly Peach. He was consecrated bishop on January 19, 1937, serving first as the assistant bishop of the New York and Philadelphia synod. In October of the same year he was made coadjutor at the request of Bishop William Culbertson. When Culbertson resigned in 1942 to accept a position teaching at Moody Bible Institute, Higgins became the bishop of the synod. In 1957, he was elected as the president and presiding bishop of the denomination, a position to which he was re-elected in 1963.

Seminary professor

Higgins’ teaching career at the seminary begin in 1930 with the death of Bishop Rudolph. At first, he taught Systematic theology, Biblical ethics and English Bible. Upon the retirement of Bishop Peach in 1937, he took the Chair of Church History, which he occupied until his retirement.

Higgins was memorialized by a fellow bishop of the church, Theophilus J. Herter, with these words: "All through the thirty-five years of his active service as bishop he followed the exhortation given him at his consecration: ‘Be to the flock of Christ a shepherd, not a wolf; feed them, devour them not. Hold up the weak, heal the sick, bind up the broken, bring again the outcasts, seek the lost. Be so merciful that you be not too remiss; so minister discipline, that you forget not mercy."

References

Sources 
Raymond A. Acker, A History of the Reformed Episcopal Seminary 1886–1964 (Phila.: Theological Seminary of the Reformed Episcopal Church, 1965).
Robert K. Rudolph, "Howard David Higgins" in Episcopal Recorder (July 1980), pp. 5ff.
Theophilus J. Herter, "A Faithful Steward" in Episcopal Recorder (July 1980), p. 21.

Calvinist and Reformed philosophers
American Reformed Episcopalians
American Calvinist and Reformed theologians
Clergy from Philadelphia
Presiding Bishops of the Reformed Episcopal Church
Reformed Episcopal Seminary faculty
1980 deaths
1903 births
20th-century Calvinist and Reformed theologians
20th-century American clergy